Cesi is a frazione of the comune of Serravalle di Chienti, Marche, central Italy. It is located at 791 m. According to the Istat census of 2001, it has 60 inhabitants.

References 

Frazioni of the Province of Macerata